O. nobilis may refer to:
 Oedemera nobilis, a beetle species found in Western Europe including the south of England
 Ophisma nobilis, a moth species found in Costa Rica
 Oreonympha nobilis, the bearded mountaineer, a hummingbird species found only in Peru
 Orthonevra nobilis, a hoverfly species
 Ostryopsis nobilis, a plant species found in China
 Otidiphaps nobilis, the pheasant pigeon, a large terrestrial pigeon species found in the primary rainforests of New Guinea and nearby islands

See also 
 Nobilis (disambiguation)